The Bayer designation η Pictoris (Eta Pictoris) is shared by two stars, in the constellation Pictor:
η1 Pictoris (HD 32743)
η2 Pictoris (HD 33042)

Pictoris, Eta
Pictor (constellation)